The NHL's American Division was formed after expansion in 1926.  The division existed for 12 seasons until 1938.

During its run as a separate division, the American Division was the slightly more successful of the league's two divisions. American Division teams won seven Stanley Cup championships compared with five won by the Canadian Division and contested three intra-divisional Finals under the cross-over playoff format then in use, compared to only one such Finals between two Canadian Division teams.

Division lineups

1926–1930
 Boston Bruins
 Chicago Black Hawks
 Detroit Cougars
 New York Rangers
 Pittsburgh Pirates

Changes from the 1925–26 season
 The American Division is formed as the result of NHL realignment.
 The Boston Bruins and Pittsburgh Pirates join the American Division.
 The Chicago Black Hawks, Detroit Cougars and New York Rangers are admitted as expansion teams. (The Black Hawks and Cougars acquired the contracts of the Portland Rosebuds and Victoria Cougars, respectively, from the disbanding Western Hockey League however the league does not consider the Chicago and Detroit franchises to be continuations of the defunct WHL teams.)

1930–1931
 Boston Bruins
 Chicago Black Hawks
 Detroit Falcons
 New York Rangers
 Philadelphia Quakers

Changes from the 1929–30 season
 The Detroit Cougars change their name to the Detroit Falcons
 The Pittsburgh Pirates moved to Philadelphia, Pennsylvania to become the Philadelphia Quakers

1931–1933
 Boston Bruins
 Chicago Black Hawks
 Detroit Falcons
 New York Rangers

Changes from the 1930–31 season
 The Philadelphia Quakers folded due to financial problems

1933–1938
 Boston Bruins
 Chicago Black Hawks
 Detroit Red Wings
 New York Rangers

Changes from 1932–33 season
 The Detroit Falcons change their name to the Detroit Red Wings

After the 1937–38 season
The league collapsed into one single table, reverting to the format of the 1925–26 season, after the Montreal Maroons folded in 1938.

Division champions
 1927 – New York Rangers (25–13–6, 56 pts)
 1928 – Boston Bruins (20–13–11, 51 pts)
 1929 – Boston Bruins (26–13–5, 57 pts)
 1930 – Boston Bruins (38–5–1, 77 pts)
 1931 – Boston Bruins (28–10–6, 62 pts)
 1932 – New York Rangers (23–17–8, 54 pts)
 1933 – Boston Bruins (25–15–8, 58 pts)
 1934 – Detroit Red Wings (24–14–10, 58 pts)
 1935 – Boston Bruins (26–16–6, 58 pts)
 1936 – Detroit Red Wings (24–16–8, 56 pts)
 1937 – Detroit Red Wings (25–14–9, 59 pts)
 1938 – Boston Bruins (30–11–7, 67 pts)

Stanley Cup winners produced
 1928 – New York Rangers
 1929 – Boston Bruins
 1933 – New York Rangers
 1934 – Chicago Black Hawks
 1936 – Detroit Red Wings
 1937 – Detroit Red Wings
 1938 – Chicago Black Hawks

See also
 History of the National Hockey League

References
 NHL History

American
Sports organizations established in 1926
Organizations disestablished in 1938